La Perdita Generacio (LPG), is a Swedish band of musicians who perform Esperanto music.

History
The group was formed during the 2003 International Youth Congress of Esperanto (Internacia Junulara Kongreso, IJK), held that year in Lesjöfors, Sweden. Initially the band comprised musicians who at that time were in Den Förlorade Generationen (DFG), a Swedish eco-band.  The meaning of both the Swedish and the Esperanto band names is the same: “The lost generation.” LPG's first concert was spontaneous and informal, occurring during the 2003 Youth Congress's Internacia Vespero (“International Evening”); the group was then invited to play a concert the following year during IJK 2004 in Kovrov, Russia, where they received the Plej interesa muzikgrupo (“Most interesting band”) award. According to an interview with Tomas Frejarö, the group's founder and principal songwriter, both the LPG and the DFG existed at that time in parallel and independently. Liner notes for Eksenlime (“Out of bounds”), their 2006 CD-ROM, also stated that La Perdita Generacio was independent of the other group.

La Perdita Generacio held concerts in Sweden, Estonia, Russia, Slovakia, Cuba, Denmark and the Netherlands, and again at the 2005 Youth Congress in Zakopane, Poland.  LPG won second prize at Internacia Televido's 2006 global Verda Stelo (“Green Star”) contest and, in May of that year, performed at the joint congress of the national Swedish and Danish Esperanto associations in Malmö. The group also performed during other North European events such as Ago-Semajno (“Action week”), a Polish New Year's festival; KEF, a Scandinavian summer Esperanto cultural festival; and Oranĝa Renkontiĝo, a Swedish harvest festival that draws Esperantists from several nearby lands.

Since 2005 LPG has been headquartered in the Swedish northern city of Härnösand, where the official international launch of Eksenlime took place in 2007. During the Oranĝa Renkontiĝo in September 2008, LPG launched their second album Eksplodigos vian domon (“We'll explode your house”), and in 2013 they released Ĉiamen plu (“Forevermore”).

LPG published CDs through Gränslösa Kulturföreningen (“Border-free cultural association”), an alternative non-profit network that publishes various Esperanto artists, and participated in the Öland harvest festival's compilation CD En musikaliska skördefest (2007). Since 2007 LPG has collaborated with Vinilkosmo, which co-published the Eksplodigos vian domon album. In 2015 the song La 100-a Fojo  (“The Hundredth time”), written to honour the 100th broadcast of the Varsovio Vento (“Warsaw wind”) podcast, earned second prize at a Kontakto music contest.

Band membership
Over the years, many different people from several countries have from time to time performed with the LPG band, including Ana Burenius, Jon Johnson, Karolina Hagegård, Thomas Frejarö, Jonas Dalmose, Mathias Dalmose, Karin Malin Ekström, Karin Nordström, Viktor Söderkvist, Ksenya Prilepskaya, Robin Rönnlund, Anna Ekman, Malak Awad, Daniel von Gertten, Camille Delepierre, Andreas Nilsson, Gus Loxbo, Amanda Lind, Anne Hagström, Hendrik Lönngren and Magnus Persson. Since 2009, the band's membership has shrunk, and often just two to four people, mainly people linked to Härnösand or Lund, will perform.

Genre
It is sometimes difficult to ascertain the genre of some of the band's songs, but the music is often characterized as alternative rock. As many of their songs take a position on various issues of contemporary society, they can also be called protest songs.

Russian reviewer Andrej Peĉonkin calls the band's Esperanto word coinage iamio (“a sometime land”), used as part of a song title, "a beautiful neologism" which combines concepts of time and space to refer to a future defined by present global warming.  However, he contests the band's use of their created word asroni, which they derive from the Persian word asroneʿh and define to mean a conversation with friends over light food, and/or drinks.

Italian reviewer Giorgio Di Nucci wrote:
“Eksenlime, edited in 2006, (...) cannot be placed into any specific genre. While the instruments used are not unusual and the melodies are not too precious, we can find some interesting and possibly even somewhat risky changes of genre, such as in  La Matenrampanto, which approximates folk style, or Ekde Gernika (“After Guernica”), which seems like an attempt at twelve-tone technique. Otherwise, however, it's a nice-sounding album.

Their newest album, Ĉiamen plu, published in 2013, parts company with the rock genre, as it lacks electric guitars and drums; compared to the former, this album is even less amenable to classification, combining a greater instrumental refinement and innovation. One should note that in a few songs, like Domoarigato, the singer hits a few false notes.”

Discography
 2013: Ĉiamen plu
 Domoarigato
 Dudek tri
 Pluku ne la florojn
 La dizertanto
 Alia aventuro
 Televido
 Ubuntu
 Ne eblas kalkuli
 Plastokanto
 Riveretoj ĉe mi
 Disfaluntoj
 Ĉu vi kontentas?
 Rulu trajn’
 2008: Eksplodigos vian domon
Malantaŭen
Iamio bruliĝas
Ne normalas, nur kutimas
Kapon en la sablo
Amokanto
Lulkanto por piratoj
Fajro kamena
Asronado sur tegmento dum helreveno
Senpromese, senperfide
Mil naŭcent okdek kvar
Sub fortepiano en Kiev'
Lasta kanto por eta Tingelingo
Ĉu timigas la ombro
 2006: Eksenlime
 Maldormemo Mia
 La Matenrampanto
 La Kosma Aventuro
 Valso kun Komunistino
 La Pasinta Generacio
 Ĉiuj ni amegas Usonon
 Ekde Gernika
 Pacon de Dio
 Revu Viviganto
 Nia Fiera Policisto
 Ĉiu momento estas vojaĝo
 Societo de Vivantaj Poetoj
 2004: en Rusio
 La Matenrampanto
 Ĉiuj ni amegas Usonon!
 La sola vojo
 Vivas mi
 LPG prezentas sin
 Nia fiera policisto
 Revu viviganto
 Ĉiu momento estas vojaĝo

References

Esperanto music
Swedish alternative rock groups
2003 establishments in Sweden
Musical groups established in 2003